Lee Jung-seon (born 15 February 1979) is a South Korean former field hockey player. He competed in the men's tournament at the 2004 Summer Olympics.

References

External links
 

1979 births
Living people
South Korean male field hockey players
Olympic field hockey players of South Korea
Field hockey players at the 2004 Summer Olympics
Place of birth missing (living people)
2002 Men's Hockey World Cup players
2006 Men's Hockey World Cup players